The 2018–19 New Zealand Football Championship season (currently known as the ISPS Handa Premiership for sponsorship reasons) was the fifteenth season of the NZFC since its establishment in 2004. Ten teams competed in the competition with Auckland City and Team Wellington representing the ISPS Handa Premiership in the 2019 OFC Champions League after finishing Champions and Premiers (Auckland City) and runner-up (Team Wellington) respectively in the 2017–18 competition.

Clubs

Regular season

League table

Positions by round

Notes:
 The match between Southern United and Auckland City in Round 3 was abandoned at 0–0 after 47 minutes due to the pitch becoming unplayable, it will be rescheduled for 14 February 2019.
 Waitakere United were tied with Wellington Phoenix Reserves at the end of Round 3 in last place.
 The match between Canterbury United and Tasman United was cancelled due to the Christchurch mosque shootings and awarded as a 0–0 draw.

Fixtures and results
The 2018–19 season sees every team play the other both home and away. With the finals series being played at the end of March 2019

Round 1

Round 2

Round 3

Round 4

Round 5

Round 6

Round 7

Round 8

Round 9

Round 10

Round 11

Round 12

Round 13

Round 14

Round 15

Round 16

Round 17

Round 18

Round 19

Round 20

Round 21

* The match between Canterbury United and Tasman United was cancelled due to the Christchurch mosque shootings and awarded as a 0–0 draw.

Finals series

Semi-finals

Grand final

Statistics

Top scorers

Hat-tricks

Own goals

References

External links
 ISPS Handa Premiership website 

New Zealand Football Championship seasons
2018–19 in New Zealand association football
New Zealand Football Championship
New Zealand Football Championship